Candlebox is an American rock band from Seattle, Washington. Since its formation in 1990, the group has released seven studio albums, several charting singles, a compilation, and a CD+DVD.

Candlebox found immediate success with the release of its self-titled debut album in July 1993. Candlebox featured four singles: "Change", "You", "Far Behind" and "Cover Me". "Far Behind" reached the top 20, and the album was certified quadruple platinum by the RIAA. The band's next album, Lucy (1995), was certified gold, and was followed three years later by Happy Pills (1998). After troubles with its record company, Candlebox broke up in 2000. The band reunited in 2006 and they have since released four more studio albums: Into the Sun (2008), Love Stories & Other Musings (2012) Disappearing in Airports (2016), and Wolves (2021).

History

Early career (1990–1992)
Formed in November 1990, Candlebox originally consisted of lead singer Kevin Martin, guitarist Peter Klett, bassist Bardi Martin, and drummer Scott Mercado.

Rise to fame (1993–2000)
Candlebox began performing live in 1991. By 1992 the band was playing regularly in some of Seattle's top clubs (including RKCNDY and Farside) to ever increasing audiences.

The band's eight-song EP gained the attention of Maverick Records, with whom the band signed. Candlebox was the first successful act on Maverick Records, which went on to sign Alanis Morissette, Deftones and The Prodigy.

On July 20, 1993, Candlebox released its self-titled debut album. It sold more than four million copies and peaked at No. 7 on Billboard's album charts. Candlebox featured the hit singles "Change", "You", "Far Behind", and "Cover Me". "Far Behind" entered Billboard's top 20 in July 1993, peaked at No. 18, and stayed on the charts until January 1994. The tremendous radio, concert, and television success gained Candlebox an opening slot for Rush on their Counterparts tour and Metallica on their Shit Hits the Sheds Tour, as well as a main-stage slot at Woodstock '94. They also played with bands like Living Colour, The Offspring, Aerosmith, Radiohead and The Flaming Lips, and by the end of 1994, the band had graduated to headlining their own tours. In addition, Candlebox won Metal Edge magazine's 1994 Readers' Choice Award for Best New Band.

Hot off the success of Candlebox, the band was eager to progress and by April 1994 had 36 new songs for a follow-up record. On October 3, 1995, Candlebox released its second album, Lucy. Although it marked the beginning of the band's decline in popularity, Lucy was certified gold thanks to singles such as "Simple Lessons" and "Understanding". Two days after the release of Lucy, Candlebox appeared on Working Class Hero: A Tribute to John Lennon with its cover of "Steel and Glass". After spending the remainder of 1995 and most of 1996 touring behind Lucy (including playing with bands like Our Lady Peace, Sponge, Seaweed, Foo Fighters, Everclear and Stabbing Westward), Scott Mercado left the band in 1997 and was replaced by original Pearl Jam drummer Dave Krusen.

On July 21, 1998, Candlebox released its third studio album, Happy Pills. While a return to the simpler sound of its debut, it gained only marginal success. The song "Glowing Soul" was also recorded for the soundtrack to The Waterboy and included at the request of Adam Sandler. Inspired by the film, the song was based on a Bo Diddley rhythm and recorded with vintage equipment.

Krusen departed from Candlebox in 1999 and was replaced by Shannon Larkin of Ugly Kid Joe. Bardi Martin left to attend college and was replaced by Rob Redick, formerly of Dig. By 2000, Candlebox disbanded. According to Martin, the band was unhappy with its record contract and attempted to be freed from Maverick after two years by breaking up. The former Candlebox members would pursue other musical endeavors during the 2000s.

Reunion (2006–present)
In 2006, Rhino Records planned to release a "Best of" compilation of Candlebox, which prompted the original band lineup to reunite for the first time in nearly 10 years (with Sean Hennesy on rhythm guitar). To promote the compilation, Candlebox embarked on a three-month North American tour from July to October of that year. Bardi Martin left the band in 2007 to continue his education to become a lawyer, with Adam Kury as his replacement. During the time, the band would begin writing new material despite having no record label.

After several delays, Candlebox released its first album in 10 years, Into the Sun, on July 22 via Silent Majority/ILG records. The album was produced by Ron Aniello (Lifehouse, Barenaked Ladies) and features performances by both Scott Mercado and Dave Krusen on drums.  The first single, "Stand", was released to radio in mid-May and Candlebox officially commenced touring in support of the new record in June 2008. "Stand" reached as high as No. 15 on the U.S. Mainstream Rock chart.

On July 4, 2008 Candlebox performed at the O'Fallon, Missouri Heritage and Freedom Fest in front of a record crowd. Two months later, the band released a live CD/DVD called Alive in Seattle.

On August 9, 2010, Candlebox kicked off a five-show stint overseas performing for U.S. troops at Camp Arifjan in Kuwait and continued on to Iraq.

In 2010, Peter Klett and Scott Mercado formed Lotus Crush, consisting of: Terry McDermott (lead vocals), Peter Klett (lead guitar), Johnny Bacolas (bass), Scott Mercado (drums), and John Luzzi (rhythm guitar).

On April 3, 2012 Candlebox released its fifth studio album, Love Stories & Other Musings produced by Ken Andrews (Failure/Thousand Foot Krutch/Lostprophets).

Although the band had planned to put out a new album in 2015, those plans were postponed after Candlebox parted ways with its record label at the time. In 2015, founding members Scott Mercado and Peter Klett announced that they were leaving the band to focus on Lotus Crush; the split was amicable. Sean Hennesy left the band shortly thereafter. Former drummer Dave Krusen rejoined the band, and new members Mike Leslie (lead guitar) and Brian Quinn (rhythm guitar) also joined.

It was announced in August 2015 that Candlebox had inked a record deal through Pavement Music and that the band was working on a new record for an early 2016 release. The album, titled Disappearing in Airports, was released on April 22, 2016.

Island Styles and former Daughtry drummer Robin Diaz joined Candlebox in late 2016 for its second live album, "Disappearing Live".

In July 2018, the original Candlebox lineup had a one-off reunion for the two live shows in Seattle, performing the band's debut album in its entirety to celebrate the 25th anniversary of its release.

Candlebox's first studio album in five years, Wolves, was released on September 17, 2021. The album was preceded six months earlier by its lead single "My Weakness".

Musical style
Candlebox's musical style, while predominantly hard rock, has a wide range of influences. Some of the band's songs have strong references to blues, grunge, rock and glam metal. Despite various aforementioned classic roots, the band's music is considered contemporary.

Band members
Current members
 Kevin Martin – lead vocals, additional guitar (1990–2000, 2006–present)
 Adam Kury – bass guitar, backing vocals, acoustic guitar (2007–present)
 Brian Quinn – rhythm guitar, backing vocals (2015–2016); lead guitar, backing vocals (2016–present)
 Island Styles – rhythm guitar, backing vocals (2016–present)
 BJ Kerwin – drums (2021–present)

Former members
 Scott Mercado – drums (1990–1997, 2006–2015, 2018, 2021)
 Peter Klett – lead guitar, backing vocals (1990–2000, 2006–2015, 2018, 2021)
 Bardi Martin – bass guitar, backing vocals (1990–1999, 2006–2007, 2012, 2018, 2021)
 Dave Krusen – drums (1997–1999, 2015–2017)
 Robbie Allen – rhythm guitar (1998–2000)
 Shannon Larkin – drums (1999–2000)
 Rob Redick – bass guitar (1999–2000)
 Sean Hennesy – rhythm guitar (2006–2015, 2021)
 Mike Leslie – lead guitar (2015–2016)
 Robin Diaz – drums (2016–2021)

Timeline

Discography

Studio albums

Compilation albums
The Best of Candlebox (May 23, 2006)

Live albums
Alive in Seattle CD+DVD (September 2, 2008)
Disappearing Live CD (April 8, 2017)

Other recordings
"Pull Away" – CD single B-side for "You" (1993)
"Far Behind/Voodoo Child" (Slight Return) [Live Medley] – CD single B-side for "Far Behind" (1994)
"Can't Give In" – Airheads Soundtrack (1994)
"Featherweight" – CD single B-side for "Simple Lessons" (1995)
"Steel and Glass" – Working Class Hero: A Tribute to John Lennon (1995)
"Glowing Soul" – The Waterboy Soundtrack (1998)
"The Answer" – iTunes exclusive bonus track from Into the Sun (2008)

Singles

Music videos
"Change"
"You"
"Far Behind"
"Cover Me"
"Simple Lessons"
"Understanding"
"Best Friend"
"It's Alright"
"Stand"
"Miss You"
"Vexatious"
"Supernova"
"All Down Hill From Here"

See also

 List of alternative rock artists
 List of musicians from Seattle
 List of post-grunge bands

Citations

References
 Foege, Alec (January 27, 1994). "New faces: Candlebox". Rolling Stone (674): 24.

External links
Official Candlebox website
Kevin Martin & Hiwatts website
Redlightmusic website

 
1990 establishments in Washington (state)
Alternative rock groups from Washington (state)
American post-grunge musical groups
Hard rock musical groups from Washington (state)
Maverick Records artists
Musical groups established in 1990
Musical groups disestablished in 2000
Musical groups reestablished in 2006
Musical groups from Seattle
Musical quartets
Heavy metal musical groups from Washington (state)
Grunge musical groups